The AZAL 2012–13 season was AZAL's eighth Azerbaijan Premier League season and their first season with Vagif Sadygov as manager. They participated in the 2012–13 Azerbaijan Premier League, finishing 7th in the initial 22 game championship. They then went unbeaten, winning nine and drawing one, as the finished top of the Relegation Group with 57 points, 17 points clear of 8th placed Khazar Lankaran. They took part in the 2012–13 Azerbaijan Cup, which they were knocked out of at the second round stage by Simurq.

Squad
Transfers
Summer

In:

 

 

Out:

 (loan return to   Inter Baku)

Winter

In:

Out:

 

Competitions
Friendlies

Azerbaijan Premier League

Results summary

Results by round

Results

League table

Note 1: The match was originally played on 02.12.2012 but suspended in 54th minute at 1-1 due to fog. The remaining minutes were played the next day.

Azerbaijan Premier League Relegation Group
Results summary

Results by round

Results

Table

Azerbaijan Cup

Squad statistics

Appearances and goals

|-
|colspan="14"|Players who appeared for AZAL no longer at the club:''

|}

Goal scorers

Disciplinary record

References

External links 

 
 AZAL PFC  at PFL.AZ

AZAL
AZAL PFC seasons